Al Gihad is a village in the District of Jabal al Akhdar in north-eastern Libya. It's located 50 km southwest  of Bayda.

References

See also 
 List of cities in Libya

Populated places in Jabal al Akhdar